Ceratophyllus lari is a species of flea in the family Ceratophyllidae. It was described by George P. Holland in 1951.

References 

Ceratophyllidae
Insects described in 1951